Zootopia (Original Motion Picture Soundtrack) is the soundtrack album to the 2016 computer-animated film of the same name, produced by Walt Disney Animation Studios. The film's score is composed by Michael Giacchino, marking his first feature-length project for Walt Disney Animation Studios, after composing for specials and short films produced by the company, as well as multiple Pixar films. In addition to the original score, the film features a song titled "Try Everything" performed by Shakira, apart from providing voice-over to the character Gazelle, with the song written by Sia and Stargate. The soundtrack was released digitally and through CD on March 4 and 25, 2016 by Walt Disney Records. A double-LP picture disc titled Music From Zootopia was released on May 19, 2017.

Composition 
Giacchino started recording for the film's score on November 16, 2015. He called the film as "one of those films with a huge heart and wonderfully realized characters set within a story that’s not only incredibly fun and entertaining but takes an honest look at our own world and the important issues we deal with living in such a diverse society.  That’s what really attracted me to the film, the chance to write music that reflects these kind of challenges." While adding that the score had "flavors of world music sprinkled everywhere", it always follow the emotional story of Hopps and Nick. With executive music producer Chris Montan and music supervisor Tom McDougall, the recording sessions began with an 80-piece orchestra conducted by Tim Simonec and was completed within 4 days.

The score consisted entirely of percussion instruments, such as onglong, gamelan, African drums, South American drums, bells and special instruments imported from Indonesia. All these were arranged and played by prominent percussionist Emil Richards, known for his collaborations with Jerry Goldsmith on the Planet of the Apes score. Emil offered Giacchino, a mixing bowl and a ram horns, which he blended and used in the score, calling it as a "perfect combination of sounds and weirdness that we can throw in there". Giacchino further created an 8-minute suite, driven through piano, making it devoid from the comedic elements and focuses in a more emotional way.

Track listing

Credits 
Credits and personnel for the soundtrack adapted from AllMusic.

 Mike Anderson – engineer
 Amund Björklund – arranger
 Marshall Bowen – conductor
 Connie Boylan – assistant contractor
 Ashley Chafin – management, music production
 Vincent Cirilli – engineer
 Dave Clauss – engineer
 David Coker – scoring assistant
 Donna Cole-Brulé – management, music business affairs
 Mae Crosby – synthesiser programming
 Andrea Datzman – music editor, score
 Brad Dechter – orchestration
 Greg Dennen – scoring crew
 Luke Dennis – technician
 Mikkel Eriksen – engineer, text
 Patricia Sullivan – mastering
 Sia Furler – text
 Earl Ghaffari – music editor, producer
 Michael Giacchino – composer, primary artist, score producer
 Tom Hardisty – engineer
 Greg Hayes – scoring crew
 Jill Heffley – executive assistant
 Tor Erik Hermansen – text
 Joel Iwataki – engineer, mixing
 Jeff Kryka – orchestration
 Espen Lind – arranger
 Tom MacDougall – music supervisor
 Chris Montan – executive producer 
 Jamie Olvera – scoring crew
 Andrew Page – music production, executive director
 Cameron Patrick – orchestration
 Daniela Rivera – assistant engineer
 Ryan Robinson – scoring crew
 Shakira – primary artist
 Tim Simonec – conductor, score orchestration
 Alki Steriopoulos – orchestration
 Phil Tan – mixing
 Brian Taylor – synthesiser programming
 Jimmy Tsai – production assistant
 Miles Walker – engineer
 Eric Wegener – synthesiser programming
 Richard Wheeler Jr. – scoring crew
 Booker White – music preparation, copyist
 Reggie Wilson – contractor

Accolades

Notes

References 

2016 soundtrack albums
Disney animation soundtracks
Walt Disney Records soundtracks
Animated film soundtracks
Michael Giacchino soundtracks
Film scores
Zootopia (franchise)